Barendorf is a municipality in the district of Lüneburg, in Lower Saxony, Germany. Barendorf has an area of 9.24 km² and a population of 2,344 (as of December 31, 2007).

References